This article features the awards of non-ministerial and independent services of the Russian Federation.

Federal Security Service of the Russian Federation

Federal Protective Service of the Russian Federation

National Guard of the Russian Federation

Foreign Intelligence Service

Medals

Decorations

Main Directorate of Special Programs of the President of the Russian Federation

Medals

Decorations

State Courier Service

Medals

Decorations

Federal Customs Service

Medals

Decorations

Federal Drug Control Service of Russia 2003–2016
The Federal Drug Control Service of Russia was created by Presidential decree № 306 of March 11, 2003.  It was abolished and integrated into the Ministry of Internal Affairs by Presidential decree № 156 of May 31, 2016.

Medals

Decorations

Federal Border Service of Russia 1993–2003

Created on 30 December 1993 to replace the Border Guard Service of the KGB following the collapse of the Soviet Union, the Federal Border Service of Russia barely lasted a decade.  It was given full autonomy by President Boris Yeltsin in an effort to reduce the power of the KGB, but was re absorbed into the new Federal Security Service on 11 March 2003 by President Vladimir Putin and renamed the Border Guard Service of the FSB of the Russian Federation.  The Federal Border Service had its own awards subordinate to state awards.  These awards, although now redesigned to be in line with the awards of the FSB, remain listed in the order of precedence of the FSB and worn on the uniform of pre 2003 recipients.

Medals

Breast Badges

Federal Agency for Government Communication and Information (FAPSI) 1991–2003
First created by Mikhail Gorbachev in 1991 from the fragmentation of KGB sub-departments following the collapse of the Soviet Union and then officially declared an independent service in 1993, the Federal Agency for Government Communication and Information, known as FAPSI, had its own awards subordinate to state awards. These awards are listed below with their establishment orders. These awards, although now redesigned to be in line with the awards of the FSO and FSB since FAPSI's 2004 merger with the protective service, remain listed in the order of precedence of the FSO and worn on the uniform of pre merger recipients.

Medals

Decorations

See also
Federal Protective Service (Russia)
Kremlin Regiment
Federal Security Service (Russia)
FAPSI
Awards and Emblems of the Ministry of Defense of the Russian Federation
Awards of the Ministry of Internal Affairs of Russia
Awards of the Ministry for Emergency Situations of Russia
Ministerial awards of the Russian Federation
Awards and decorations of the Russian Federation
Honorary titles of the Russian Federation
Awards and decorations of the Soviet Union

External links
Official website of the Federal Protective Service of the Russian Federation 
Official website of the Federal Security Service of the Russian Federation 
Official website of the Federal Customs Service of Russia 
Official website of the Foreign Intelligence Service of the Russian Federation 
Official website of the General Directorate of Special Programs of the President of the Russian Federation 
Official website of the State Courier Service of Russia

References

Orders, decorations, and medals of Russia
Russian awards
Military awards and decorations of Russia